Eki or EKI may refer to:

Eki
 Eki (goddess), the Basque goddess of the sun
 Eki language
 Eki Nurhakim (born 1983), Indonesian footballer
EKI
 Elkhart Municipal Airport, in Indiana, United States
 Eklakhi Junction railway station, in West Bengal, India
 Institute of the Estonian Language (Estonian )